Mbandaka (formerly known as Coquilhatville in French, or Coquilhatstad in Dutch) is a city on the Congo River in the Democratic Republic of Congo located near the confluence of the Congo and Ruki rivers. It is the capital of Équateur Province.

The headquarters of the Fourth Naval Region of the Navy of the Democratic Republic of the Congo are located in Mbandaka.

Geography 
Mbandaka lies on the east bank of the Congo River below the mouth of the Ruki River, a tributary of the Congo. South of the Ngiri Reserve, a large area of swamp forest on the opposite bank of the Congo, it is located at the center of the Tumba-Ngiri-Maindombe Ramsar wetland.

Description
Mbandaka is the capital of Équateur province, and located only a few miles/kilometres from the equator. It is home to Mbandaka airport and is linked by riverboat to Kinshasa and Boende.

It is located in a busy travel corridor upriver from the capital, Kinshasa. The latter city of about 10 million is an hour's plane ride away, or a four- to seven-day trip by river barge. 

Mbandaka is largely populated by people of the Mongo ethnic group, although people from many different tribes and regions live in the city. The main languages spoken in Mbandaka are Lingala, French, and Mongo.

Years of war and neglect have caused deterioration of the city infrastructure; large areas of the city are without electricity or running water. Most of the streets and avenues of the city are unpaved dirt roads.

History

Mbandaka was founded in 1883 by British explorer Henry Morton Stanley, who named it "Équateurville". (At the time the territory was under Belgian rule and the official language was French.)

Mbandaka is one of the closest to the equator of any substantial city in the world. Stanley placed a large "Equator Stone" near the riverbank south of the city to mark the point where he believed the equator crossed the river. It remains there today. Due to its symbolic location close to the equator and the Congo River, there were early plans to locate the capital of the Congo Free State in Coquilhatville, as the city was then called, but they never came off the drawing board. These plans included infrastructure for an estimated population of 100,000 people, a train station, a Catholic cathedral, a governor's residence, and a palace for future visits of King Leopold II of the Belgians.

In 1886, at the beginning of colonial rule, the Belgians changed the city's name to "Coquilhatville" naming it after Camille-Aimé Coquilhat.

In 1938, work began on a bridge over the Congo River connecting Coquilhatville with the French Congo (now the Republic of Congo). Work was abandoned on the outbreak of the Second World War, and only the foundations of the bridge pillars remain. In the 1930s, the Government of the Belgian Congo began several projects, including factories and a new city hall. 

The city hall was completed in 1947, just after the end of the Second World War. A statue of Leopold II was installed on its roof. The city hall was destroyed by a fire in 1963.

After the Belgian Congo gained its independence as the Republic of the Congo, the new government changed the name of this city in 1966 to "Mbandaka" to honour a prominent local leader.

Massacre of Hutus
Near the end of the First Congo War in the late 20th century, hundreds of people (mainly Hutu refugees, women, and children) were massacred here on May 13, 1997.
Congolese soldiers said the order came from Col. Wilson, head of a brigade of Kabila's troops, and Col. Richard, the brigade's operations chief, both Rwandans. Gen. Gaston Muyango (Congolese) held the title of military commander but had no real power, they said.

Ebola outbreak
On 16 May 2018, a case of Ebola occurred in the city, the disease having spread there from an outbreak in the countryside. A new outbreak was reported on 1 June 2020. Three cases were confirmed by the WHO and three cases are probable, of whom four people had died as of June 2, 2020.

Notable places

Catholic Mission station and Central African history research centre of Bamanya

Eala Botanical Garden
The Eala Botanical Garden, founded in 1900, contains between 4,000 and 5,000 species. Because of warfare and social disruption, the garden has been neglected. It is unfenced and subject to illegal logging. The last catalogue of its holdings was published in 1924.

First Habitat for Humanity International housing project
Mbandaka is the home of the world's first project of Habitat for Humanity International.  Founder Millard Fuller served as missionary with the Disciples of Christ Church in Mbandaka from 1973 to 1976.  The housing project Fuller started in Mbandaka in 1973 became known as the first project of Habitat for Humanity when Fuller founded Habitat upon his return to the United States.

Climate
Mbandaka has a tropical rainforest climate (Af) under the Köppen climate classification.

The city is located at the center of the Tumba-Ngiri-Maindombe area, designated a Wetland of International Importance by the Ramsar Convention in 2008.

Notable residents

 Guy Loando Mboyo
 Roger Hitoto
 Frédéric Boyenga-Bofala
 José Bosingwa
 Adam Bombolé
 Issama Mpeko
 Banza Mukalay
 Jules Fontaine Sambwa

See also
University of Mbandaka
Mbandaka Airport

References

External links
The Botanical Gardens of Zaire and the Present State of Biodiversity in Zaire
 

 
Populated places established in 1883
Populated places in the province of Équateur
Communities on the Congo River
1883 establishments in Africa